Lawton  may refer to:
 Lawton Chiles (1930–1998), an American politician from the U.S. state of Florida
 Lawton Fitt (born 1953), American banker
 Lawton Nuss (born 1952), a Kansas Supreme Court Justice
 Lawton S. Parker (1868–1954), an American impressionist painter

English masculine given names